Francesco De Fabiani (born 21 April 1993) is an Italian cross-country skier.

Athletic career
De Fabiani had his first World Cup start during the 2013–14 season. His first event was the Tour de Ski 5 km Free prologue in Oberhof, Germany. He also competed for Italy at the 2014 Winter Olympics in the cross country skiing events. At the end of 2015 he was top ten in the overall statistics which is the best he has ever done.

De Fabiani had his international breakthrough during the 2014–15 season. This season he recorded his first World Cup victory in the 15 km classical event in Lahti. He also won the Helvetia U23 World Cup Ranking.

Cross-country skiing results
All results are sourced from the International Ski Federation (FIS).

Olympic Games

Distance reduced to 30 km due to weather conditions.

World Championships
2 medals – (1 silver, 1 bronze)

World Cup

Season titles
 2 titles – (2 U23)

Season standings

Individual podiums
1 victory – (1 ) 
10 podiums – (3 , 7 )

Team podiums
 2 victories – (1 , 1 ) 
 5 podiums – (2 , 3 )

References

External links

1993 births
Living people
Olympic cross-country skiers of Italy
Cross-country skiers at the 2014 Winter Olympics
Cross-country skiers at the 2018 Winter Olympics
Cross-country skiers at the 2022 Winter Olympics
Italian male cross-country skiers
Tour de Ski skiers
People from Aosta
FIS Nordic World Ski Championships medalists in cross-country skiing
Sportspeople from Aosta Valley
Cross-country skiers of Gruppo Sportivo Esercito